Lindsay Allen (born March 20, 1995 in Clinton, Maryland) is an American professional basketball player for the Minnesota Lynx of the Women's National Basketball Association (WNBA). She played basketball at the University of Notre Dame. Allen was drafted in the second round (14th overall) of the 2017 WNBA Draft by the Liberty.

Professional career 
Allen was drafted early in the second round by the Liberty but she was the final cut as the Liberty cut down their roster to the limit. Because she was cut, she was able to finish her final week of college and participate in the graduation ceremonies. Before she could even unpack she got a call from the liberty asking her to return to the team. Brittany Boyd had sustained an injury and would be out for the season. Bill Laimbeer, the Liberty coach was surprised that Allen hadn't been claimed by another team so was happy to have her back on the team.

Professional career 
Lindsay Allen signed to play with Dynamo Moscow for the 2017–18 season.

Allen has also played in the Australian Women's National Basketball League, playing with the Melbourne Boomers for three seasons. She was part of the Boomers' 2022 championship-winning team, winning the Rachael Sporn Medal as most valuable player of the Finals series.

On July 21, 2022, Allen signed a 7-day contract with the Minnesota Lynx.

WNBA career statistics

Regular season

|-
| align="left" | 2017
| align="left" | New York
| 28 || 0 || 13.4 || .371 || .000 || .700 || 1.5 || 2.2 || 0.6 || 0.0 || 0.7 || 1.9
|-
| align="left" | 2018
| align="left" | Las Vegas
| 24 || 6 || 14.9 || .384 || .063 || .708 || 1.3 || 2.9 || 0.6 || 0.0 || 0.9 || 3.1
|-
| align="left" | 2020
| align="left" | Las Vegas
| 21 || 21 || 13.5 || .424 || .353 || .800 || 1.1 || 2.4 || 0.3 || 0.0 || 0.8 || 3.3
|-
| align="left" | 2021
| align="left" | Indiana
| 32 || 8 || 17.8 || .428 || .298 || .811 || 1.5 || 3.0 || 0.5 || 0.1 || 1.0 || 5.4
|-
| align="left" | 2022
| align="left" | Minnesota
| 9 || 0 || 14.9 || .526 || .571 || .923 || 1.6 || 3.4 || 0.2 || 0.0 || 0.8 || 6.7
|-
| align="left" | Career
| align="left" | 5 years, 4 teams
| 114 || 35 || 15.1 || .419 || .271 || .787 || 1.4 || 2.7 || 0.5 || 0.0 || 0.8 || 3.8

Playoffs

|-
| align="left" | 2017
| align="left" | New York
| 1 || 0 || 5.0 || .000 || .000 || .000 || 1.0 || 3.0 || 0.0 || 0.0 || 0.0 || 0.0
|-
| align="left" | 2020
| align="left" | Las Vegas
| 5 || 1 || 6.4 || .333 || .000 || .000 || 0.2 || 0.4 || 0.2 || 0.2 || 1.2 || 1.2
|-
| align="left" | Career
| align="left" | 2 years, 2 teams
| 6 || 1 || 6.2 || .333 || .000 || .000 || 0.3 || 0.8 || 0.2 || 0.2 || 1.0 || 1.0

Notre Dame statistics
Source

Allen ended her collegiate career as the all-time assist leader at Notre Dame and in the ACC, and with the most consecutive starts in Notre Dame history.

References

External links
Notre Dame Fighting Irish bio
USA Basketball bio

1995 births
Living people
All-American college women's basketball players
American women's basketball players
Basketball players from Maryland
Indiana Fever players
Las Vegas Aces players
McDonald's High School All-Americans
Minnesota Lynx players
New York Liberty draft picks
New York Liberty players
Notre Dame Fighting Irish women's basketball players
Parade High School All-Americans (girls' basketball)
People from Mitchellville, Maryland
Point guards